Paradise Square is a Georgian square in the City of Sheffield. It may also refer to:
 Firdos Square in Baghdad
 Paradise Square in Five Points, Manhattan
 Paradise Square (musical), a stage musical